Ebrahimabad-e Shur (also Romanized as Ebrāhīmābād-e Shūr and Ebrahim Abad Shoor; also known as Ebrāhīmābād and Ibrāhīmābād) is a village in Azadegan Rural District, in the Central District of Rafsanjan County, Kerman Province, Iran. At the 2006 census, its population was 49, in 11 families.

References 

Populated places in Rafsanjan County